Benitec Biopharma Ltd is an Australian biotechnology company founded in 1997. It is engaged in the development of gene-silencing therapies for the treatment of chronic and life-threatening diseases using DNA-directed RNA interference (ddRNAi) technology.

The Commonwealth Scientific and Industrial Research Organisation (CSIRO) has researched RNAi extensively, developing the small hairpin RNA concept employed in ddRNAi. Benitec Biopharma has an exclusive license to this ddRNAi technology in human therapeutic uses and research.

Research and development 

Benitec Biopharma is researching ddRNAi in the following fields:
Hepatitis B (under development with partner Biomics Biotechnologies))
Oculopharyngeal muscular dystrophy (OPMD)

References

External links 
 Benitec Biopharma website

Biotechnology companies of Australia
Stem cells
Biopharmaceutical companies
Genetic engineering
Companies based in Sydney
Multinational companies headquartered in Australia
Biotechnology companies established in 1997
Companies listed on the Nasdaq
Companies formerly listed on the Australian Securities Exchange
Australian brands
Pharmaceutical companies established in 1997
Australian companies established in 1997
Science and technology in Melbourne